Postencephalitic trophic ulcer is an ulceration of the nose similar to trigeminal trophic lesions, and has been reported following epidemic encephalitis and herpes zoster of the trigeminal nerve.

See also 
 List of cutaneous conditions

References 

Neurocutaneous conditions
Varicella zoster virus-associated diseases